The black-and-yellow grosbeak (Mycerobas icterioides) is a species of finch native to the northern parts of the Indian subcontinent, primarily the lower and middle Himalayas. It is in the family Fringillidae.

The species ranges across Afghanistan, India, Iran,  Nepal, and Pakistan where its natural habitat is temperate forests.

Gallery

Phylogeny
Eophona genus goes together with Mycerobas genus. Both genera form a single phylogenetic group.

References

black-and-yellow grosbeak
Birds of Afghanistan
Birds of Pakistan
Birds of North India
Birds of Nepal
black-and-yellow grosbeak
Taxa named by Nicholas Aylward Vigors
Taxonomy articles created by Polbot